Monolaurin (abbreviated GML; also called glycerol monolaurate, glyceryl laurate, and 1-lauroyl-glycerol) is a monoglyceride. It is the mono-ester formed from glycerol and lauric acid. Its chemical formula is  C15H30O4.

Uses
Monolaurin is most commonly used as a surfactant in cosmetics, such as deodorants.  As a food additive it is also used as an emulsifier or preservative. Monolaurin is also marketed as a dietary supplement.

Occurrence
Monolaurin is found in coconut oil and may be similar to other monoglycerides found in  human breast milk.

Lauric acid can be ingested in coconut oil and the human body converts it into monolaurin, furthermore, coconut oil, coconut cream, grated coconut and others products are excellent sources of lauric acid and, consequently, monolaurin. Researchers are unsure of conversion rates of lauric acid obtained through foods like coconut oil or coconut to monolaurin in the body. Because of this fact, it is unknown how much coconut oil or coconut one would need to ingest to receive a therapeutic dose of monolaurin. Some articles suggest it may be upwards of 100-300mL of coconut oil per day, making ingesting coconut oil unrealistic compared to monolaurin capsules.

Pharmacology

Monolaurin has shown some antibacterial, antiviral, and other antimicrobial effects test tubes, but no usefulness in treating patients has been established.  

Monolaurin is sold as a dietary supplement and as an ingredient in certain foods. The United States Food and Drug Administration categorizes it as generally recognized as safe. The Food and Drug Administration does not test whether dietary supplements benefit health or nutrition, as it does with medicines and medical treatments.

Monolaurin is known to inactivate lipid-coated viruses by binding to the lipid-protein envelope of the virus, thereby preventing it from attaching and entering host cells, making infection and replication impossible. Other studies show that Monolaurin disintegrates the protective viral envelope, killing the virus. Monolaurin has been studied to inactivate many pathogens including Herpes simplex virus and Chlamydia trachomatis.

Monolaurin also shows promising effects against bacteria (both gram-positive and gram-negative), yeast, fungi, and protozoa. Bacteria including E. coli, yeast including Candida albicans, Helicobacter pylori (H. pylori), Giardia lamblia, Staphylococcus aureus (Staph), and other microbes have all been neutralized by monolaurin in scientific studies. Monolaurin also presented antibacterial and anti-biofilm properties against Borrelia burgdorferi and Borrelia garinii, the bacterium which cause Lyme disease in humans.

Monolaurin does not seem to contribute to drug resistance.

References 

Non-ionic surfactants
Lipids
Laurate esters